S68 may refer to:
 S-68, a Greenlandic sport club
 S68 (Long Island bus)
 S68 (Rhine-Ruhr S-Bahn), a commuter rail line
 BMW S68, an automobile engine
 County Route S68 (Bergen County, New Jersey)
 Gunaikurnai language
 Sikorsky S-68, an American helicopter design
 S68, a type of New Zealand standard school building
 Siemens S68, a Siemens mobile phone